Temnikov is a town in the Republic of Mordovia, Russia.

Temnikov (masculine) or Temnikova (feminine) may also refer to:
Elena Temnikova (born 1985), Russian singer
Gennady Temnikov, winner of the 2001 Philadelphia Marathon
Ivan Temnikov (born 1989), Russian soccer player
Maria Temnikova (born 1995), Russian swimmer
Roman Temnikov, member of the Central Revision Committee of the Party for Democratic Reforms (Azerbaijan)